Suzuki TC250 may refer to:

 A scrambler version of the Suzuki T20 produced in 1967-68
 A scrambler version of the Suzuki T250 produced in 1970